Soo is a 2007 South Korean film directed by Yoichi Sai (also known as Choi Yang-il).

Plot
Tae-soo tries to steal from a gang. The gang catches Tae-soo's brother Tae-jin instead. The incident causes the brothers to separate. Tae-soo becomes a mob fixer and an assassin. Tae-jin becomes a police detective. When a call brings the brothers together, they get ready for brotherly bonding, but Tae-jin is killed. Tae-soo decides to get revenge on his brother's killer.

Cast
Ji Jin-hee as Tae-soo
Park Chan Yang as young Tae-soo
Kang Sung-yeon as Kang Mi-na
Moon Sung-keun Gu Yang-won
Lee Ki-young as Nam Dal-gu
Jo Kyung-hwan as Song-in ("Boss")
Oh Man-seok as Jeom Park-yi
Choi Deok-moon as Lee Won-jae
Yang Young-jo as Yoo Seon-il
Kim Jun-bae as Kim Jin-man
Choi Jung-woo as Detective squad chief of police department team 2
Park Hyuk-kwon as Detective Jang			
Jo Seok-hyeon as Detective Park
Lee Jae-gu as Detective Choi

Theatrical release
Soo was released in South Korea on March 22, 2007, and was ranked fifth at the domestic box office on its opening weekend, grossing .

Critical reception
Kevin Ma of Love HK Film reviewed the film saying, "Soo's concept is somewhat successful on paper because it doesn't take the easy way to revenge. In execution, Soo is wildly uneven, moving between slow exposition scenes of plot development and raw, brutal fight scenes dominated by chaos. However, it remains a compelling and violent action film thanks to Sai's fluid camerawork during the action scenes and the performances of his actors. Special kudos go to star Ji Jin-Hee, who sheds his romantic leading man reputation to become a believable killer who can stab and punch his way out of a fight. Sai also sheds the expectations put on him after Blood and Bones by delivering an arthouse spin on a straightforward revenge film. Still, the film's ultimate effectiveness remains highly debatable."

Derek Elley of Variety reviewed the film saying, "A onetime killer hits the road to self-redemption by tracking down his brother's killer in "Soo," a coolly told, often brutal yarn that remains strangely involving despite its flaws. High-concept idea—a twin brother takes on his dead cop brother's identity to solve a crime he's also been hunted for by the cops—has strong remake potential. Pic itself, which bombed on South Korean release in March, is more ancillary or film week fare."

Lee Hyo-won of The Korea Times reviewed the film saying, "Soo is a memorable film. In Korean, "soo" means water, the very essence of life. Throughout the film Soo seeks to free his brother from "han" or spiteful grudge, as well as his own soul from staggering guilt. Even the Bad Guy wishes to spare his father the fires of hell. Choi's lasting imagery of water washing away blood suggests the pervasive human instinct to survive and the desire to purge oneself of one's impurities."

References

External links 
  
 
 
 

2007 films
2000s crime action films
2007 action thriller films
2007 crime thriller films
South Korean action thriller films
South Korean crime thriller films
South Korean crime action films
South Korean neo-noir films
Films about organized crime in South Korea
Films directed by Yōichi Sai
Cinema Service films
2000s Korean-language films
Yakuza films
2000s Japanese films
2000s South Korean films